Sondheim may refer to:

 Sondheim (surname)
 Stephen Sondheim (1930–2021), American stage musical and film composer and lyricist
 Sondheim vor der Rhön, Bavaria, Germany
 Sondheim Theatre, a theatre in the West End of London